Phat khing is a Thai dish, that is popular in Thailand and Laos. 

Kai phat khing (ไก่ผัดขิง) contains stir-fried chicken and different vegetables like mushrooms and peppers, but other meats may be used. The defining ingredient is sliced ginger ("khing") which gives the dish a very characteristic taste. Other important ingredients in this dish are soy sauce and onion. It is served with rice. In both countries chicken gizzards are sometimes (partially) substituted for chicken.

References

External links
Thai Stir-Fry of Chicken, Fresh Ginger, and Mushrooms: Gai Pad Khing
Quick Lao Ginger Chicken Recipe

Lao cuisine
Thai cuisine